Balua is a village in Barhara block of Bhojpur district in Bihar, India. As of 2011, its population was 7,829, in 1,292 households.

References 

Villages in Bhojpur district, India